Cencrastus was a magazine devoted to Scottish and international literature, arts and affairs, founded after the Referendum of 1979 by students, mainly of Scottish literature at Edinburgh University, and with support from Cairns Craig, then a lecturer in the English Department, with the express intention of perpetuating the devolution debate. It was published three times a year. Its founders were Christine Bold, John Burns, Bill Findlay, Sheila G. Hearn, Glen Murray and Raymond J. Ross. Editors included Glen Murray (1981–1982), Sheila G. Hearn (1982–1984), Geoff Parker (1984–1986) and Cairns Craig (1987). Raymond Ross was publisher and editor of the magazine for nearly 20 years (1987–2006). Latterly the magazine was published with the help of a grant from the Scottish Arts Council. It ceased publication in 2006.

Contributors included Christopher Harvie, Duncan Macmillan, Stephen Maxwell, Brian Holton, Craig Beveridge, Ronald Turnbull, Colin McArthur, Randall Stevenson, Glenda Norquay, Jim Gilchrist, Freddie Anderson and Fred Johnston

Cencrastus is one of the cultural and political magazines researched by the Scottish Magazines Network.

References

 Records deposited in National Library of Scotland GB233/Acc.11509, Acc.10396 and Acc.12644

1979 establishments in Scotland
2006 disestablishments in Scotland
Triannual magazines published in the United Kingdom
Defunct political magazines published in the United Kingdom
Defunct magazines published in Scotland
Magazines established in 1979
Magazines disestablished in 2006
Politics of Scotland
Political magazines published in Scotland